The Central Elevated Walkway is an extensive footbridge network spanning Admiralty, Central and parts of Sheung Wan, near Victoria Harbour in Hong Kong.

The system was built in phases by the Hong Kong Government and various developers, such as Hongkong Land, Jardine Matheson Holdings and Shun Tak Holdings. It has escalators and staircases for access. Parts of it are air-conditioned. There is another system in Admiralty that is currently not connected to the Central system.

History
In the 1970s, Hongkong Land built a footbridge over Connaught Road to facilitate pedestrian access between Connaught Place (today's Jardine House), Swire House (today's Chater House) and the General Post Office. The developer also built many footbridges between its buildings which were under construction.

In the 1980s, after Exchange Square was completed, the government built a footbridge to connect to Hongkong Land's network; it ran west along the harbourfront to connect Central Piers and Shun Tak Centre. Other buildings along Queen's Road Central, such as Standard Chartered Bank Building and Central Tower, were also connected to the system.

In 1993, the Central–Mid-Levels escalator came into operation, and Hang Seng Bank Building was connected.

In 1998, the International Finance Centre and Airport Express Hong Kong station were completed and brought into the network.

After 2000, the government built a bridge between World-Wide House and Exchange Square.

Central system

Coverage 
 East to: The Landmark, Prince's Building, MTR Hong Kong station, Central station
 South to: Hang Seng Bank main branch, Central–Mid-Levels escalator, Soho, Conduit Road
 West to: Shun Tak Centre (Sheung Wan), Hong Kong–Macau Ferry Terminal, MTR Sheung Wan station
 North to: International Finance Centre, Central Piers, MTR Hong Kong station

Connected buildings
 International Finance Centre
 City Hall
 Jardine House
 Exchange Square
 General Post Office
 World-Wide House
 Chater House
 Alexandra House
 Mandarin Oriental
 Prince's Building
 9 Queen's Road Central
 Bank of East Asia main branch
 Standard Chartered Bank Building
 The Landmark
 Central Building
 Central Place
 Hang Seng Bank building
 Central Market
 Harbour Building
 Infinitus Plaza
 Shun Tak Centre

Admiralty system

Coverage 
 East to: CITIC Tower, MTR Admiralty station
 South to: Hong Kong Park, CITIC Tower
 West to: Hutchison House, AIA Central, Cheung Kong Center
 North to: City Hall

Connected buildings
 Pacific Place
 CITIC Tower
 United Centre
 Admiralty Centre
 Queensway Plaza
 Far East Finance Centre
 Lippo Centre
 Queensway Government Offices
 Fairmont House
 Murray Road Carpark Building
 Bank of China Tower
 Cheung Kong Center
 Hong Kong Park
 Three Garden Road
 Bank of America Tower
 Hutchison House(redevelopment in progress)
 AIA Central

External links

 Labyrinth in the Air - TV program by Radio Television Hong Kong on the Central Elevated Walkway and the related Central–Mid-Levels Escalators System. (video archive)
 Pedestrian Footbridge System, Central:  

Skyways
Central, Hong Kong
Transport in Hong Kong
Pedestrian bridges in Hong Kong